The Kore Gang: Outvasion from Inner Earth is an action-adventure game for the Wii. The game is notable for its very prolonged development cycle over the course of ten years, during which many different companies became involved and the game moved from being designed for the Xbox console to the Wii.

In the game, the player takes control of three different characters stuck inside robotic suits that amplify their individual abilities. The gameplay is centered on the player's ability to switch between the three characters at any time and thus utilize and combine their abilities to solve puzzles. The story revolves around the Krank Brothers, evil rulers of a civilization that exists in the center of the Earth. The player, with the help of the three playable characters Pixie, Madboy, and Rex, must stop the Kranks from carrying out their plan to conquer the surface of the planet as well. The plot alludes to the subtitle, "Outvasion from Inner Earth".

After being released in August 2010 in Germany through the now-defunct publisher Pixonauts, general international releases followed through distributors such as Atari.

Plot

After a series of earthquakes, a drill-shaped vehicle emerges from the ground, the Krank Tank. It is commanded by the Krank Brothers, who intend to conquer the Earth. Pixie, Madboy and Rex use the Kore Suit, invented by scientist Dr. Samuelsen, to stop the Kranks.

Development
The game was originally conceived by designer Klaus Lyngeled, formerly of Shiny Entertainment. He quit his job at Shiny to found his own company, Zoink, in order to be able to work full-time on this project.

Zoink began to develop a version of the game for the Xbox. In 2003, CDV Software obtained the publishing rights, but had to drop the project soon after due to financial difficulties.

In 2006, independent production house Games Foundation obtained a license to further develop the game, and announced a version for the Wii.

The PAL version is multi-language and contains English, German, French and Spanish voices-overs.

Reception

The game received mixed reviews. Critics such as those for Wiisworld praised the madcap sense of humor and colorful graphics but criticized the clumsy camera control. The game's aggregate score on Metacritic is 70/100.

Alexander Winkel of GameZone gave a game 8.4 out of 10 saying that "Nevertheless, this title is one of the best Wii games and captivates above all with a beautiful art design and a good dose of humor."

Thomas Nickel of Eurogamer had compared the game formula to Banjo Kazooie, Crash Bandicoot and Rayman.

Lars Peterke of Nintendo WiiX gave it a score of 8.2 out of 10 and compared it to Mario Galaxy.

References

2010 video games
3D platform games
Adventure games
Atari games
Cancelled Xbox games
Video games developed in Germany
Video games developed in Sweden
Wii-only games
Wii games
Single-player video games
Zoink games